"Come Together" is a song by Scottish rock band Primal Scream, released in August 1990 as the second single from their third studio album Screamadelica (1991). The song peaked at number 26 on the UK Singles Chart. The single versions of the song, mixed by Terry Farley, are radically different from the album version which was mixed by Andrew Weatherall. Whilst the Farley mix follows a standard pop song structure, Weatherall's extended album mix is more influenced by house music and dub mixes and features none of Bobby Gillespie's vocals. In the US, the single was released as a double A-side with the band's previous single "Loaded".

A shorter edit of the song was featured on the compilation Trainspotting #2.

In 2013, a remix of the song was produced by Daniel Avery and was signed by British television network BT Sport to provide the theme tune for coverage of the Barclays Premier League other live events.

Track listing
All tracks written by Bobby Gillespie, Andrew Innes, Robert Young except where noted

UK 12" (Creation)
 "Come Together (12" Farley Mix)" – 8:02
 "Come Together (12" Weatherall Mix)" – 10:12

UK CD (Creation)
 "Come Together (7" Farley Mix)" – 4:23
 "Come Together (12" Weatherall Mix)" – 10:12

UK 7" and cassette (Creation)
 "Come Together (7" Farley Mix)" – 4:23
 "Come Together (7" Weatherall Mix)" – 4:45

US 12" and CD (Sire)
 "Come Together (7" Farley Mix)" – 4:23
 "Loaded (7" Mix) – 4:15
 "Come Together (12" Farley Mix)" – 8:02
 "Loaded (12" Mix) – 7:01
 "I'm Losing More Than I'll Ever Have" – 4:33
 "Ramblin' Rose (Live NYC)" (Fred Burch, Marijohn Wilkin) – 2:25
 "Loaded (Farley Mix) – 5:56

Charts

References

1990 singles
1990 songs
Primal Scream songs
Creation Records singles
Song recordings produced by Andrew Weatherall
Songs written by Bobby Gillespie
Songs written by Andrew Innes
Songs written by Robert Young (musician)